Chloé Webster (born May 22, 1989 in Kinross, Scotland) is a Scottish actress best known for her role as Daphne in the British TV series Indian Summers.

Early life

Webster was born and raised in Kinross, Scotland. She found her love for performing at a young age when she started dance classes at Jacqueline Crawford's School of Dance, and then attended Edinburgh's Telford College to study musical theatre.

Professional career

Webster moved to New York City at the age of 19, where she continued her studies, earning a bachelor of fine arts degree in musical theatre at the American Musical and Dramatic Academy. She performed in plays and musicals, and worked as a supporting artist on Gossip Girl and Blue Bloods. After three years, she returned to Scotland to continue working in TV and theatre.

She then moved to bigger roles, including Channel 4's period drama Indian Summers, which ran from 2015 to 2016 and the movie 1965.

Selected appearances

Film

Stage

Television

References

External links
 

1989 births
21st-century Scottish actresses
Living people